AMUM may refer to:

`Amum, a village in eastern Yemen
Art Museum of the University of Memphis